Izatha dulcior is a species of moth in the family Oecophoridae. It is endemic to New Zealand. This species is classified as "At Risk, Naturally Uncommon" by the Department of Conservation. I. dulcior is the first lepidoptera species described as endemic to the Poor Knights Islands.

Taxonomy and etymology
This species was first described by Robert J. B. Hoare in 2010 using a specimen collected at the Tawhiti Rahi South Ridge on Poor Knights Island on the 3 December 1980 by R.H. Kleinpaste. Hoare named the species Izatha dulcior. The epithet of this name is derived from the Latin word dulcior meaning gentler. It refers to the lack of deciduous cornuti in the vesica of the male as well as the lack of a sharp point on the outer edge of the forewing basal fascia. These features distinguish this species from Izatha epiphanes. The holotype specimen is held at the New Zealand Arthropod Collection.

Description 
The wingspan is 18.5–24.5 mm for males and 19.5–20.5 mm for females. In appearance this species is very similar to darker forms of I. epiphanes. However, as mentioned previously, it can be distinguished from this species by the difference in the forewing colouration as well as the structural differences in the male genitalia.

Distribution 
The species is endemic to New Zealand.  It is the first lepidoptera species to be described as endemic to Poor Knights Islands.

Behaviour and biology
Very little is known of the biology of this species and the larvae are as yet unknown. Adults are on the wing in early December and are attracted to light.

Conservation Status 
This species has been classified as having the "At Risk, Naturally Uncommon" conservation status under the New Zealand Threat Classification System.

References

Oecophorinae
Moths described in 2010
Moths of New Zealand
Endemic fauna of New Zealand
Endangered biota of New Zealand
Endemic moths of New Zealand